White River may refer to the following streams in the U.S. state of Michigan:

 White River (White Lake), in Muskegon and Oceana Counties
 White River (Huron County, Michigan), in Huron County

See also 
 White River (disambiguation)
 White River Township, Michigan

Rivers of Michigan
Set index articles on rivers of Michigan